Krikor Odian (December 9, 1834, Constantinople (now Istanbul), Ottoman Empire - August 6, 1887, Paris, France) was an Ottoman Armenian jurist, politician, and writer.

He was a key figure in the establishment of the Armenian National Constitution and the Ottoman constitution of 1876. He was the uncle of the famed Armenian playwright and writer Yervant Odian.

References 

Ethnic Armenian politicians
19th-century Armenian writers
Politicians from Istanbul
Armenians from the Ottoman Empire
1834 births
1887 deaths
Burials at Père Lachaise Cemetery
Jurists from the Ottoman Empire
Ethnic Armenian lawyers
19th-century writers from the Ottoman Empire
Politicians of the Ottoman Empire
Lawyers from the Ottoman Empire
Ottoman expatriates in France